Opening Fire: 2008–2014  is the first compilation album by American thrash metal band Power Trip. The album gathers songs that have never appeared on an album. The album documents their self-titled 7” single, "This World" (from The Extermination Vol: 2 LP compilation by Flatspot Records), "Hammer of Doubt" (2010 version from America's Hardcore LP compilation by Triple B Records), and the entirety of The Armageddon Blues Sessions.

Background
All tracks have been remastered by the band's longtime producer Arthur Rizk with the release being rounded out by artwork from Portland illustrator Matt Stikker. Power Trip's vocalist, Riley Gale commented in an interview with Revolver:

Reception

Sam Houlden of Punknews.org gave the album 4/5 stars in his review.

Track listing

All tracks written by the band:

References

2018 compilation albums
Power Trip (band) albums